Yangzhong is a county-level city under the administration of Zhenjiang, Jiangsu province, China. It is the easternmost county-level division of Zhenjiang City.

History 
There were only several smaller shoals in the area of present-day Yangzhong during the Eastern Jin. As time went on, they enlarged and merged into an elongated shoal by Tang dynasty, which was called Xiaozhou (literally: "Small shoal") in Song dynasty. It was renamed Xinzhou and then Ximinzhou during Ming dynasty, and was designated Taipingzhou in Qing dynasty.

In 1904, the imperial court decided to establish a subprefecture named after Taiping. In 1911, it was promoted to a county. Since there is a namesake in Anhui. The county was renamed Yangzhong, the abbreviation of "" which means "(the shoal is) in the Yangtze River".

Overview 
 In 1938, the Japanese army captured the county, then it was governed by the pro-Japanese collaborators.
 In 1939, the Jiangnan Counter-Japanese Volunteers' Army attacked the county, then the Nationalist Government controlled it.
 In 1940, the Japanese army recaptured the county.
 In July 1945, the force of CPC overthrew the puppet county government, but the Nationalist Government controlled the county in December.
 On 22 April 1949, the PLA captured the county.
 In 1994, the county was turn into a county-level city.

Administrative divisions
In the present, Yangzhong City has 5 towns and 1 other.
5 towns

1 other
 Yangzhong Economic Development Zone

Climate

References

External links
Yangzhong City English guide (Jiangsu.NET)

Cities in Jiangsu
County-level divisions of Jiangsu
Zhenjiang